Holy Family Catholic High School may refer to:

Holy Family Catholic High School, Carlton, a secondary school in Carlton, North Yorkshire, England
Holy Family Catholic High School (Minnesota), a high school in Victoria, Minnesota, United States
Holy Family Catholic High School, Thornton, a secondary school in Thornton, Merseyside, England

See also
Holy Family Catholic School (disambiguation)
Holy Family High School (disambiguation)
Holy Family School (disambiguation)
Holy family (disambiguation)